The Saint Lucianese ambassador in Washington, D.C. is the official representative of the Government in Castries to the Government of the United States.

List of representatives